Bisanda Buzurg town and a nagar panchayat municipality in Banda district  in the state of Uttar Pradesh, India. Pin Code of Bisanda is 210203. Language of  Bisanda is Bundeli, Hindi.

Demographics
 India census, Bisanda Buzurg city is divided into 11 wards for which elections are held every 5 years. The Bisanda Buzurg Nagar Panchayat has population of 25,611 of which 13,138 are males while 12,473 are females as per report released by Census India 2011. About 94% are Hindu and 6% Muslim.

Buzurg is commonly called as BISANDA and the distance of Khajuraho from Bisanda is about 135 km, and Chitrakoot is about 64 km.

References

Cities and towns in Banda district, India